Chesterton is a suburb in the northeast corner of Cambridge, in the Cambridge district, in the county of Cambridgeshire, England,  north of Cambridge station, on the north bank of the River Cam.

History
It is also the name of two electoral wards (West Chesterton and East Chesterton) in the city. The total population of both wards at the 2011 Census was 18,134. These are roughly the same as the area normally called Chesterton: specifically the land north of the River Cam, east of Castle Hill and south of the Arbury and King's Hedges estates.

City councillors for the area are Councillors Gerri Bird, Baiju Thittala and Carla McQueen.  As county council divisions are different from city council wards, part is covered by Cllr Ian Manning and part by Cllr Elisa Meschini.

A large housing association estate makes up part of the East Chesterton area.

A local board of health (urban sanitary district) was formed for Chesterton in 1880, becoming Chesterton urban district under the Local Government Act 1894. This was abolished in 1912, with the urban area becoming part of the municipal borough of Cambridge, and the larger but less populous rural part forming part of the Milton parish. In 1921 the parish had a population of 11,611. On 1 April 1923 the parish was abolished and merged with Cambridge.

Buses run seven times an hour to Cambridge city centre and six times an hour to each of Milton and Addenbrooke's Hospital.

Milton Road (the A1309 and A1134) is the major arterial road through Chesterton, linking the centre of Cambridge to the southwest with the A14 road to the northeast.

A new Cambridge North railway station, built on the edge of East Chesterton, became operational in May 2017, something that had been campaigned for by numerous local politicians for decades.

Notable people
Horace Gray (1874–1938), cricketer
Leo Reid (1888–1938), cricketer
Veronica Volkersz (1917 – 2000) aviator, Air Transport Auxiliary pilot in the Second World War, first woman to fly an operational jet fighter

See also 
 Chesterton Tower A medieval dwelling
 Chesterton (UK Parliament constituency) A former constituency
 Chesterton railway station Closed 1850
 Chesterton Road
 St Andrew's Church, Chesterton

References

External links 
Chesterton Community Association
VIE Residents' Association

Populated places in Cambridgeshire
Former civil parishes in Cambridgeshire
Geography of Cambridge